Kihachirō (written: 喜八郎) is a masculine Japanese given name. Notable people with the name include:

, Japanese puppet designer and animator
, Japanese businessman
, Japanese voice actor

Japanese masculine given names